Motokazu Kenjo (born 18 March 1969) is a Japanese windsurfer. He competed at the 2000 Summer Olympics and the 2004 Summer Olympics.

References

External links
 
 

1969 births
Living people
Japanese windsurfers
Japanese male sailors (sport)
Olympic sailors of Japan
Sailors at the 2000 Summer Olympics – Mistral One Design
Sailors at the 2004 Summer Olympics – Mistral One Design
Asian Games silver medalists for Japan
Asian Games bronze medalists for Japan
Asian Games medalists in sailing
Sailors at the 1998 Asian Games
Sailors at the 2002 Asian Games
Medalists at the 1998 Asian Games
Medalists at the 2002 Asian Games
People from Fujisawa, Kanagawa